Peter Gösta Schantz, born on 28 April 1954 in Stockholm, Sweden, graduated as doctor in medical sciences  at the Karolinska Institute in Stockholm in 1986, became professor in human movement sciences at Mid-Sweden University in Östersund, Jämtland, in 2008, and professor in human biology, including the multidisciplinary field of movement, health and environment, at the Swedish School of Sport and Health Sciences, GIH, in Stockholm, Sweden, in 2013.

Schantz was recruited as PhD student by his teacher, professor Per-Olof Åstrand at the Karolinska Institute. He got the basic training as researcher within the field of exercise physiology, primarily studying the adaptation in human skeletal muscle with physical training and detraining. In order to study whether muscle fibre type transformation, from fast to slow, could occur, studies of 1500 km ski touring along the Swedish mountain range (Fjällmarsch TranTre, in 1978; which he initiated, organized and participated in ) and 800 km sledge pulling in the arctic parts of Scandinavia (The 1982 Minnesota Lappland Expedition, organized by Concordia College, Minnesota, USA) were included in his doctoral thesis Plasticity of human skeletal muscle from 1986.

In 2002 he proposed that the dogma formulated by the gymnasiarch Per Henrik Ling in the 19th century, “human movements should be based on the laws of the human organism” should have the following addendum: “and be executed in forms and under conditions that comply with the ecosystem and a sustainable development.” He had by that time already expanded his research interests into the multidisciplinary field of physical activity, public health and sustainable development. An initial focus on issues related to outdoor life recreation in periurban green areas is mirrored in the books The National Urban Park – An Experiment in Sustainable Development (2002), The European City and Green Space (2006), Forests, Trees and Human Health (2011)., and Why Large Cities Need Large Parks. Large Parks in Large Cities (2021).

His current research focus is on exercise physiology and active transportation. This has led him to suggest a public health recommendation of 6000 transport steps, five days a week, in order to gain optimal health effects.
 With the aim of understanding how route environmental variables affect the wellbeing during walking or cycling, he coined the term: environmental unwellbeing 

Schantz was involved as expert at the Swedish National Institute of Public Health (2009–2013), and was advisor for WHO in the development of the WHO Health Economic Assessment Tool (HEAT) for cycling and walking.

Schantz has taken several initiatives in the cultural sphere. One of them is the sculpture at the place where the Royal Central Institute of Gymnastics, created by Per Henrik Ling, was placed in Stockholm, Sweden, between 1813 and 1944.

He was also one of the initiators of a process leading to the establishment of the first national urban park in Sweden, i.e. the one in Greater Stockholm.

In 2016 he was awarded the prize of Samfundet S:t Erik.

Selected bibliography

Schantz, Peter. 2002. Summary. Nationalstadsparken – The National Urban Park – An Experiment in Sustainable Development. Studies of values, law application and developmental Projects. In: Nationalstadsparken – ett experiment i hållbar utveckling.: Studier av värdefrågor, lagtillämpning och utvecklingslinjer / [ed] Lennart Holm, Peter Schantz, Stockholm: Formas , 2002, 249–261 s

 De Vries, S., Claßen, T., Eigenheer-Hug, S-M., Korpela, K., Maas, J., Mitchell, R. & Schantz, P. 2011. Contributions of Natural Environments to Physical Activity. Theory and Evidence Base. (Eds. Nilsson, K.., Sangster, M., Gallis, C., Hartig, T., de Vries, S., Seeland, K.. & Schipperijn, J.). In: Forests, Trees and Human Health, Springer Verlag, Berlin.

 
 
 Schantz, P. & Lundvall, S. 2014. Changing perspectives on physical education in Sweden. Implementing dimensions of public health and sustainable development. In: Physical Education and Health: Global Perspectives and Best Practice (Eds. Cristopher Edginton & Mingkai Chin), pp 463–475, Urbana, IL, USA: Sagamore Publishing Company
 Schantz, P. 2014. Physical activity behaviours and environmental well-being in a spatial context. In: Geography and Health – A Nordic Outlook. Chief eds. Schærström, A., Jørgensen, S.H. & Sivertun, Å. Swedish National Defence College: Stockholm; Norwegian University of Science and Technology (NTNU): Trondheim; Universität Bonn: Bonn 
 
 Stigell, E & Schantz, P. 2015. Active Commuting Behaviors in a Nordic Metropolitan Setting in Relation to Modality, Gender, and Health Recommendations. International Journal of Environmental Research and Public Health 12/2015; 12(15008):15626-15648
 Schantz, P. 2015. Along paths converging to Bengt Saltin´s early contributions in exercise physiology" Scandinavian Journal of Medicine and Science in Sports, Vol. 25, nr Suppl. 4, 7–15
 Johansson, C., Lövenheim, B., Schantz, P., Wahlgren, L., Almström, P., Markstedt A., Strömgren, M., Forsberg, B. & Sommar J.N. 2017. Impacts on air pollution and health by changing commuting from car to bicycle. Science of the Total Environment 584–585:55–63

Schantz, P. Wahlgren, L., Salier-Eriksson, J., Sommar, J.N., Rosdahl, H. 2018. Estimating duration-distance relations in cycle commuting in the general population. PLoS ONE 13(11)
Schantz P, Salier Eriksson J, Rosdahl H. 2019. The heart rate method for estimating oxygen uptake: Analyses of reproducibility using a range of heart rates from cycle commuting. PLoS One 14(7)
Schantz P, Salier Eriksson J, Rosdahl H. 2019. The heart rate method for estimating oxygen uptake: Analyses of reproducibility using a range of heart rates from commuter walking. Eur J Appl Physiol (p 1-17) 
Schantz P. 2019. Alfred Nobel and his unknown coworker. Norrbottens-Kuriren, December 18
Strömgren, M., Schantz, P., Nilsson Sommar, J., Raza, W., Markstedt, A. and Forsberg, B. 2020. Modelling commuter modal shift from car trips to cycling: Scenario construction and outcomes for Stockholm, Sweden. Journal of Transport Geography 86 (2020) 102740
  Schantz P, Salier Eriksson, J, Rosdahl, H. 2020. Perspectives on exercise intensity, volume and energy expenditure in habitual cycle commuting. Front. Sports Act. Living 2:65
 Olsson K, Salier Eriksson J, Rosdahl H, Schantz P. 2020. Are heart rate methods based on ergometer cycling and level walking interchangeable? PLoS ONE 15(8): e0237388
 Sommar JN, Schantz P, Strömgren M, and Forsberg B. 2021. Potential for reduced premature mortality by current and increased bicycle commuting: a health impact assessment using registry data on home and work addresses in Stockholm, Sweden. BMJ Open Sport & Exercise Medicine 2021;7:e000980.
Sommar JN, Johansson C, Lövenheim B, Schantz P, Markstedt A, Strömgren M, Stigson H, and Forsberg B. 2021. Overall health impacts of a potential increase in cycle commuting in Stockholm, Sweden. Scand J Publ. Health 1-13.
Salier Eriksson, J, Olsson, KSE, Rosdahl H & Schantz, P. 2021. Heart rate methods can be valid for estimating intensity spectrums of oxygen uptake in field exercise. Frontiers in Physiology 12, 687566.
Schantz P. 2021. Can nature really affect our health? A short review of studies. In: Why Cities Need Large Parks. Large Parks in Large Cities, (ed. R. Murray), London: Routledge/Stockholm: Medströms
Olsson, KSE, Rosdahl, H & Schantz, P. 2022. Interchangeability and optimization of heart rate methods for estimating oxygen uptake in ergometer cycling, level treadmill walking and running. BMC Med Research Methodol 22:55
Schantz, P, Olsson, KSE, Salier Eriksson, J, & Rosdahl, H. 2022. Perspectives on exercise intensity, volume, step characteristics and health outcomes in walking for transport. Front. Public Health 10:911863

References

External links
 Peter Schantz publications at ResearchGate.
 Peter Schantz publications at Google Scholar.
 Peter Schantz' publications at DIVA.
The Research Unit for Movement, Health and Environment
The Research Project on Physically Active Commuting in Greater Stockholm (PACS)

1954 births
Living people
Karolinska Institute alumni
Academic staff of Mid Sweden University
Academic staff of Örebro University
Academic staff of the Swedish School of Sport and Health Sciences